Óscar Darío Ayala Ojeda (born 3 April 1985) is a Paraguayan international footballer who plays as a centre back.

Career
Ayala has played for General Díaz, Rubio Ñu and Boca Unidos.

He made his international debut for Paraguay in 2011.

References

External links

1985 births
Living people
People from Mariano Roque Alonso
Paraguayan footballers
Paraguay international footballers
Paraguayan expatriate footballers
Paraguayan Primera División players
Primera Nacional players
Ecuadorian Serie A players
General Díaz footballers
Boca Unidos footballers
Club Rubio Ñu footballers
L.D.U. Loja footballers
Sportivo Luqueño players
Atlético San Luis footballers
C.S.D. Macará footballers
Deportivo Capiatá players
Paraguayan expatriate sportspeople in Argentina
Paraguayan expatriate sportspeople in Ecuador
Paraguayan expatriate sportspeople in Mexico
Expatriate footballers in Argentina
Expatriate footballers in Ecuador
Expatriate footballers in Mexico
Association football defenders